Octopus rubescens (Commonly the East Pacific red octopus, also known as the ruby octopus, a preferred common name due to the abundance of octopus species colloquially known as red octopus) is the most commonly occurring shallow-water octopus on much of the North American West Coast, and a ubiquitous benthic predator in these habitats. Its range extends from the southern Gulf of California at least to the Gulf of Alaska, but may also occur in the western Pacific Ocean. O. rubescens occurs intertidally  to a depth of 300 m.

Taxonomy
In the years prior to the description of this species in 1953, O. rubescens was widely considered to be a young Enteroctopus dofleini.  Many early descriptions were based on a combination of O. rubescens and E. dofleini.  To date, the taxonomy of this species remains somewhat unresolved.  S.S. Berry’s 1953 description is in truth a brief diagnosis, and considering the exceptionally wide range of the species, the animals currently covered under O. rubescens may prove to represent several subspecies or a species complex.

Size and description

O. rubescens generally grows to a mantle length of 8–10 cm (3.1 - 3.9 in), and arm length of 30–40 cm (11.8 - 15.7 in). Adult weight is generally 100–150 grams (3.5 - 5.3 Oz), but animals up to 400 grams (14.1 Oz) in weight have occasionally been observed.

Like all octopuses, O. rubescens can change its color and texture, making its appearance highly variable.  Color can vary from a deep brick red, to brown, to white, or mottled mixtures of the three.  It can be easily confused with small individuals of Enteroctopus dofleini in the northern end of this species' range.  The two can be differentiated by the presence of three eyelash-like papillae below the eyes of O. rubescens that are absent in E. dofleini.

Diet and foraging behavior 
O. rubescens is a generalist predator and has been maintained on a wide variety of gastropods, bivalves, crabs and barnacles in the lab. So far, very little quantification of its diet in the wild has been made.  The two studies on the subject determined diets in Puget Sound, Washington to be dominated by gastropods, particularly Nucella lamellosa and Olivella baetica, but also composed of clams, scallops and crabs.  The planktonic larvae of O. rubescens have also been observed in the wild to consume krill.

As part of its feeding behavior, O. rubescens will pounce on prey and display a stereotypical sequence of color changes at the moment of capture. Following the capture of bivalve prey, it will often drill a hole through the shell to deliver venom and more easily open the shell.  The octopuses will often concentrate their drill holes near the adductor muscles of the bivalve prey.

A recent study has suggested O. rubescens may choose prey based on fat digestibility rather than on the amount of calories the octopuses is able to obtain from the food items. If this is true, the authors further argue, this would make O. rubescens a specialist predator by some measures, rather than a generalist, due to it specific nutrient requirements.

Other behavior

O. rubescens was the first invertebrate in which individual personalities were demonstrated.

References

External links

Walla Walla University Marine Invertebrate Key

Octopuses
Molluscs of the Pacific Ocean
Marine molluscs of North America
Western North American coastal fauna
Marine fauna of the Gulf of California
Fauna of California
Molluscs described in 1953
Taxa named by Samuel Stillman Berry